Rhizocyon ("root dog") is an early member of the subfamily Borophaginae, an extinct subgroup of canids that were endemic to western North America during the Oligocene epoch, living from ~31—24.5 Ma., existing for approximately .

Rhizocyon was similar to a contemporary species, Archaeocyon leptodus, from the Great Plains, but it shows a few subtle differences in the structure of the skull and dentition that indicate that Rhizocyon may be close to the ancestry of later borophagines. Only a single species, R. oregonensis, is known and all fossils come from the John Day Formation in Oregon.

References

Wang, Xiaoming., R.H. Tedford, and B.E. Taylor. 1999. Phylogenetic systematics of the Borophaginae (Carnivora, Canidae). Bulletin of the American Museum of Natural History, 243:1-391.
 Balisi, Mairin and B. Van Valkenburgh. 2020. Iterative evolution of large-bodied hypercarnivory in canids benefits species but not clades. Communications Biology 3(461).

Borophagines
Oligocene canids
Aquitanian genus extinctions
Oligocene mammals of North America
Prehistoric carnivoran genera
Rupelian genus first appearances
Taxa named by Xiaoming Wang